This is a list of British investors.

 Simon Acland
 Robert Arthington
 Emily Benn
 Mark Blandford
 Jerome Booth
 Richard Branson
 Robert Coke
 Peter Dicks
 Peter Dubens
 Robert Earl
 Anne Glover
 Richard Goldthorpe
 David Grainger
 Charles Green
 Ronald Grierson
 Richard Hambro
 John Hamilton, 2nd Lord Belhaven and Stenton
 David Harding
 Keith R. Harris
 Clive Fiske Harrison
 John Howie
 Thomas Hughes-Hallett
 Arthur Ingram
 Ewan Kirk
 John Langston
 Kevin Johnson
 Lyndon Lea
 J. Keith Lomas
 Michael Moritz
 Stephen Peel
 Yana Peel
 Michael Platt
 John Robert Porter
 John N. Reynolds
 David Ricardo
 Michael Richardson
 Nathan Mayer Rothschild
 Ivor Royston
 Amber Rudd
 Jim Slater
 Smurfie Syco
 Ian Wace
 Craig Whyte
 Annie Henrietta Yule
 Poju Zabludowicz

See also
 :Category:British investors

Investors
British